The 1912 season was the first season for Santos Futebol Clube, a Brazilian football club, based in the Vila Belmiro bairro, Zona Intermediária, Santos, Brazil. The club played one friendly match against a local club.

Squad

Friendly matches

References

External links
Official Site 

Santos
1912
1912 in Brazilian football